Johann Sebastian Bach composed the church cantata  (Soar joyfully upwards), 36, in Leipzig in 1731 for the first Sunday in Advent. He drew on material from previous congratulatory cantatas, beginning with Schwingt freudig euch empor, BWV 36c (1725). The Gospel for the Sunday was the Entry into Jerusalem, thus the mood of the secular work matched "the people's jubilant shouts of Hosanna". In a unique structure in Bach's cantatas, he interpolated four movements derived from the former works with four stanzas from two important Advent hymns, to add liturgical focus, three from Luther's "" and one from Nicolai's "". He first performed the cantata in its final form of two parts, eight movements, on 2 December 1731.

History and words 
Bach composed the cantata in 1731 in Leipzig, for the First Sunday of Advent, the beginning of the Lutheran church year. In Leipzig this was the only Sunday in Advent when a cantata was performed, whereas tempus clausum (quiet time) was observed on the other three Sundays. The prescribed readings for the Sunday were from the Epistle to the Romans, "night is advanced, day will come", and from the Gospel of Matthew, the Entry into Jerusalem.

Bach based parts of the music on a homage cantata of the same name, which he had composed for the birthday of a Leipzig University teacher and first performed in spring 1725. The text was probably written by Picander, who modified it to a congratulatory cantata for Countess Charlotte Friederike Wilhelmine of Anhalt-Köthen, first performed on 30 November 1726. Another version was a congratulatory cantata for a member of the Rivinius family from Leipzig, probably in 1735.

Bach transformed the secular music to a cantata for the first Sunday in Advent, first by combining four movements and simply adding a chorale, the final stanza of "". The librettist of this adaptation, who stayed close to the secular cantata without reference to the readings, is unknown. Klaus Hofmann notes that the jubilant opening matches the Gospel of the entry into Jerusalem "with the people's jubilant shouts of Hosanna". The date of the adaptation is not certain, because the version is extant only in a copy by Bach's student Christoph Nichelmann.

Finally in 1731, Bach reworked the cantata considerably and wrote a new score. He interpolated the arias not with recitatives, but with three stanzas from Luther's hymn for Advent, "". This main hymn for the first Sunday in Advent had already opened his cantata for the same occasion in 1714, and he had used it as the base for his chorale cantata , in 1724. The hymn stanzas "serve to anchor the cantata to some extent in the Advent story, and to give it liturgical purpose and a clear focus". John Eliot Gardiner terms it "structurally unusual". Bach divided the cantata in two parts to be performed before and after the sermon, closing part I with a stanza from Nicolai's hymn. For context, he replaced stanza 7, which had closed the whole cantata, by stanza 6, and closed part II by the final stanza of Luther's hymn.

Bach first performed the cantata on 2 December 1731, one week after .

Scoring and structure 

The cantata is scored for four soloists—soprano, alto, tenor and bass—a four-part choir, and a Baroque instrumental ensemble of two oboes d'amore, two violins, viola and basso continuo. It is structured in two parts of four movements each. Its interpolation of chorus and arias with chorales is unique in Bach's cantatas.

Music 
The cantata is unique in Bach's church cantatas in its structure of arias combined with chorale instead of recitatives. Performed one week after , it shows Bach's emphasis on the chorale even beyond his second cycle of chorale cantatas, begun in 1724.

The opening chorus is opened by a ritornello, dominated by two contrasting motifs: the strings play a short rising figure in triplets, the oboes d'amore play an expansive melody. As in the secular model, the movement is in two similar parts, each consisting of two contrasting sections, "" (Soar joyfully upwards to the exalted stars) and "" (Yet stop!). The bass voice, the lowest register, enters first, followed by the tenors, altos, and sopranos. This ascending sequence also reflects the text: "soaring aloft", literally "swinging upward".

Gardiner, who conducted the three cantatas for the first Sunday in Advent during the Bach Cantata Pilgrimage with the Monteverdi Choir in 2000, described the movement as a "spiritual madrigal – capricious, light-textured and deeply satisfying once all its virtuosic technical demands have been met: those tricky runs, divisions and chromatic intervals in all voices, and the chains of triplet figuration in the unison oboes d'amore and first violins". He compares the figures on "" (stop) in the middle section to "" (where) in the aria "" in Bach's St John Passion.

All three settings of the stanzas from Luther's chorale are different, beginning with a duet for soprano and alto for the first stanza. The voices are doubled by the oboes d'amore and render the text in sections of different length, with sixteen measures for the final "" (that God had ordained such a birth for Him). Alfred Dürr notes the expressiveness of the music, especially in leaps of sixths on the urgent request "" (now come), syncopated rhythm on "" (over whom the whole world marvels), and daring chromatic on the final line. The tenor aria reflects "" (Love approaches with gentle steps) with oboe d'amore as obbligato instrument, "the traditional musical symbol of love", alluding to the concept of Jesus as the bride-groom and the Soul as the bride, which is also the base for Nicolai's hymn that closes part I in a "rousing four-part harmonisation".

The bass aria beginning part II, "" (Welcome, worthy treasure!) shows "echoes of the first movement" and avoids a regular da capo structure. The bass voice is the vox Christi, addressing the bride. The welcoming gesture from the secular cantata seems appropriate for the expressed sentiment. The next hymn stanza, "" (You who are like the Father), the sixth stanza from Luther's hymn "dealing with the sins of the flesh and Christ's mission to redeem humankind", is marked "molt' allegro". The tenor sings the chorale melody unadorned as a cantus firmus, but the oboes d'amore play with "the urgent surging of semi-quaver activity". Dürr sees the expression of "" (fight and victory of the Son of God) over "" (weak/sick flesh) of man. Gardiner compares it to a trio sonata movement. He terms the last aria "a berceuse of pure enchantment" and compares it to the "echo aria" from part IV of Bach's Christmas Oratorio. The text "" (Also with muted, weak voices) is illustrated by a muted (con sordino) solo violin. The closing choral, the final stanza of Luther's hymn, "" (Praise be to God, the Father) is a four-part setting.

Recordings 
A list of recordings is provided by the Bach Cantatas Website. Choir with one voice per part (OVPP) and ensembles playing period instruments in historically informed performance are marked by green background.

References

Cited sources 
Scores
 
 

Books
 

 

Online sources

Several databases provide additional information on each cantata, such as history, scoring, sources for text and music, translations to various languages, discography, and musical analysis.

The complete recordings of Bach's cantatas are accompanied by liner notes from musicians and musicologists, John Eliot Gardiner commented his Bach Cantata Pilgrimage, Klaus Hofmann wrote for Masaaki Suzuki, Christoph Wolff for Ton Koopman.

External links 
 Schwingt freudig euch empor, BWV 36: performance by the Netherlands Bach Society (video and background information)
 Luke Dahn: BWV 36.4 bach-chorales.com
 Luke Dahn: BWV 36.8 bach-chorales.com

Church cantatas by Johann Sebastian Bach
1731 compositions
Advent music